

Diapsids

Newly named choristoderes

Newly named ichthyosaurs

Newly named dinosaurs

Synapsids

Non-mammalian

Paleontologists
 The fossil collection of the recently deceased Reverend William Fox, which contained over 500 specimens, was bought by the trustees of the British Museum of Natural History.

References